Locust Grove is an unincorporated community in Independence County, Arkansas, United States. Locust Grove has a post office with ZIP code 72550.

References

External links
Encyclopedia of Arkansas History & Culture entry

Unincorporated communities in Independence County, Arkansas
Unincorporated communities in Arkansas